Walter Wykes (born October 31, 1969) is an American playwright. A graduate of the MFA playwriting program at the University of Nevada, Las Vegas, he has had over thirty plays produced across the United States and internationally. Four times he has received the American College Theater Festival's Award for Excellence in Playwriting.

Wykes is known for writing intense roles and dark subject matter. The bulk of his dramatic work has an absurdist or surrealist bent, creating a dreamlike or nightmarish atmosphere that reflects the sometimes senseless nature of the modern world.

Plays
 The Father Clock (1997)
 The Profession (1997)
 The Salmon Tribunal (1997)
 Borrowed Parts (1998)
 Fading Joy (2000)
 The Worker (2007)
 Family 2.0 (2007)
 The Spotted Man (2007)
 The Unwanted (2008)
 Beer Girl (2009)
 The Fly (2010)
 Tainted Love (2010)
 The Secret Origin of Mojo Man (2011)
 Certificate of Death (2012)

Trivia
 From June 1998 to Februar, Wykes played the role of Ensign Thomas in Star Trek: The Experience, an interactive show at the Las Vegas Hilton.
 He has appeared as an actor in numerous television commercials including spots for Burger King, Dunkin' Donuts, Helio, Best Western, Qwestdex, Long John Silver's, and Domino's Pizza.

References

External links
 Walter Wykes: Short Plays
 Walter Wykes: Monologues

1969 births
Living people
20th-century American dramatists and playwrights